Paolo Mazzoleni (born 12 June 1974) is an Italian football referee. He was a full international for FIFA from 2011 to 2018.

References 

1974 births
Living people
Italian football referees